The Sun Shines Again is the third studio album by American singer Sunshine Anderson. It was released by Verve Forecast Records on November 2, 2010 in the United States.

Critical reception

AllMusic editor Andy Kellman wrote that Anderson's third album "further demonstrate that the singer has clearly moved past her troubles. While the album is not likely to make Anderson more popular than ever, it’s a triumph – a fan-pleasing one, at that."

Track listing

Charts

References

2010 albums
Sunshine Anderson albums